Herbert Ulysses Gaillard Fielding (July 6, 1923 – August 10, 2015) was an American politician who became the first African-American elected as a Democrat to the South Carolina General Assembly.

Family and early years
Herbert Ulysses Fielding was the son of Julius and Sadie Fielding. Fielding served in the United States Army during World War II prior to attending and receiving his B.S. degree from West Virginia State College in 1948.

In 1952, Fielding took charge of the day-to-day operations of the family funeral home business, becoming President and CEO of Fielding Home for Funeral Services. Founded in 1912 by Fielding’s father, Fielding Home for Funeral Services was the largest African American-owned and operated funeral home in the state of South Carolina. Fielding died on August 10, 2015.

Civil Rights Movement
Fielding became involved in the Civil Rights Movement in the 1960s. He often paid for the bail of civil rights activists, picketers and demonstrators. Fielding encouraged African Americans to vote and mobilized them to memorize the constitution in order to gain voting rights. Fielding's political papers from that era are housed at the College of Charleston.

South Carolina General Assembly
Fielding was elected to the South Carolina House of Representatives in 1970, becoming the first African American to be elected a representative in South Carolina since Reconstruction. In that same election, Democrat John C. West defeated the Republican nominee, Albert W. Watson for governor. Fielding served for three years, then returned to the South Carolina State House in 1983. In 1985, Fielding was elected to South Carolina’s State Senate, where he served until 1992. In 1990, he became the chairperson of the South Carolina Legislative Black Caucus.

References

1923 births
2015 deaths
Democratic Party members of the South Carolina House of Representatives
Politicians from Charleston, South Carolina
West Virginia State University alumni
Democratic Party South Carolina state senators
African-American state legislators in South Carolina
Activists for African-American civil rights
African-American activists
21st-century African-American people